See Dad Run is an American sitcom television series that premiered on Nick at Nite on October 6, 2012, after a one-hour premiere of the iCarly episode, "iShock America" with 1.641 million viewers. The series is that after a decade on television, actor David Hobbs (Scott Baio) becomes a stay-at-home dad so his soap opera star wife (Alanna Ubach) can get back in the spotlight, but he quickly realizes that playing a dad on television is much different from the real thing. He has to take care of his three kids, Emily (Ryan Newman), Joe (Jackson Brundage) and Janie (Bailey Michelle Brown) with the help of his best friends, Marcus (Mark Curry) and Kevin (Ramy Youssef). Baio also serves as an executive producer. Nickelodeon has ordered twenty episodes of the series. On December 19, 2012. Nick at Nite renewed the series for a second season, which premiered on June 2, 2013. On October 21, 2013, the series was renewed for a third season. Each episode title begins with the words "See Dad".

Series overview 
{|class="wikitable plainrowheaders" style="text-align:center;"
|-
! scope="col" style="padding:0 8px;" rowspan="2" colspan="2"| Season
! scope="col" style="padding:0 8px;" rowspan="2"| Episodes
! scope="col" style="padding:0 80px;" colspan="2"| Originally aired (U.S. dates)
|-
! scope="col" style="padding: 0px 8px"| First aired
! scope="col" style="padding: 0px 8px"| Last aired
|-
| scope="row" style="background:#006600; color:#006600;"|
| [[List of See Dad Run episodes#Season 1 (2012–13)|1]]
| 20
| 
| 
|-
| style="background:#0047AB; color:#0047AB;"|
| [[List of See Dad Run episodes#Season 2 (2013–14)|2]]
| 15
| 
| 
|-
| scope="row" style="background:#FDEE00; color:#0047AB;"|
| [[List of See Dad Run episodes#Season 3 (2014)|3]]
| 16
| 
| 
|}

Episodes

Season 1 (2012–13)

Season 2 (2013–14) 
On December 19, 2012, See Dad Run was renewed for a second season. The season premiered on June 2, 2013. Raven-Symoné guest starred in the episode "See Dad Run a Fever", as Whitney Gibbons, a morning talk show host who wants David to appear on her show. The episode reunited Raven-Symoné with Mark Curry, who previously worked together on the 1990s sitcom Hangin' with Mr. Cooper. Happy Days creator Garry Marshall reunited with Scott Baio in the episode "See Dad See Dad Run". Marshall played Bernie, David's TV father from his old sitcom. Marshall's son, Scott directed the episode.

Season 3 (2014) 
On October 21, 2013, See Dad Run was renewed for a third season. It will be the final season of the series as announced on March 17, 2014. Initially ordered for thirteen episodes, the episode order has now increased, due to a number of unaired season two episodes, now airing as season three episodes, along with a one-hour series finale which was also ordered for the season.

References 

General references 
 
 
 
 

Lists of American sitcom episodes
Lists of Nickelodeon television series episodes